Bojan Udovič (22 July 1957 – 11 July 2015) was a Slovene cyclist. He competed in the individual road race and team time trial events at the 1980 Summer Olympics, where three of the four members of the Yugoslav cycling team were Slovenes. Together with a fellow cyclist, Udovič was killed by a drunk driver near Medvedjek on 11 July 2015 while cycling.

References

External links
 

1957 births
2015 deaths
Slovenian male cyclists
Yugoslav male cyclists
Olympic cyclists of Yugoslavia
Cyclists at the 1980 Summer Olympics
Sportspeople from Kranj
Road incident deaths in Slovenia